Ronald "Rony" Gardener was an Olympian and field hockey player from Pakistan. He played two matches for Pakistan's National Field Hockey Team. He was part of the Pakistani national team during the 1960 Summer Olympics where Pakistan won the gold medal after defeating India.

See also
 Pakistan at the 1960 Summer Olympics
 List of Pakistani field hockey players

References

External links

Olympic field hockey players of Pakistan
Pakistani male field hockey players
Field hockey players at the 1960 Summer Olympics
Year of birth missing
Possibly living people
Medalists at the 1960 Summer Olympics
Olympic gold medalists for Pakistan
Place of birth missing (living people)
Pakistani Christians
20th-century Pakistani people